Krokstadøra is the administrative center of the municipality of Orkland in Trøndelag county, Norway. Snillfjord Church is located in the village.

References

Orkland
Villages in Trøndelag